St Martin's Church is a Grade II listed parish church in the Church of England in Bole, Nottinghamshire.

History

The church dates from the 13th century. It was restored in 1866 by Ewan Christian.

Bells 
There are three bells at St Martin's Church.

The three bells are in a wooden frame for three bells with traditional fittings in a dilapidated state, making them unringable. The treble weighs 4 cwt, dated 1611 and cast by Henry II Oldfield, the second weighs 4.5 cwt, dated 1500+ and cast by John Seliok. The tenor weighs 5.5 cwt, dated 1611 and cast by Henry II Oldfield. The bells are rung from ground floor.

Clock 
There is evidence of there once being a clock at St Martin's church. The room under the bells is where the clock would have been situated. There is a picture of the church that was given to a vicar in the Second World War, that showed a clock face on the south side of the tower.

Clays Group of Churches 

St John the Baptist, Clarborough
St Peter, Hayton
St Peter & St Paul, North Wheatley
St Peter & St Paul, Sturton le Steeple ;and
St Martin, Bole

The Church of England church and the Methodist chapel in North Wheatley are now known as "Church in Wheatley". At South Wheatley there are ruins of the church of St Helen.

Clergy 
The Clays Group has the one Vicar, the Team Vicar, Rev M Cantrill who has the responsibility of all the above parishes. He is an ordained Church of England and Methodist Minister. He has the responsibility of Grove Street Methodist church, Retford. The Clays Group has a Lay Reader.

Vicars of Bole

Although a church at Bole was mentioned in Domesday Book, the names of most of its clergy before the late 14th century have been lost.  Prior to 1864 the vicars had been non-resident in the parish for about two hundred years.  Hence most of the routine work during this period would probably have been carried out by assistant curates.

1317-?  Roger de Nassington (still vicar in 1335)
              (some names missing)
1377 John Attewell
1390 Gilbert Thynne (or Gilbert Tymme)
1429 John Pye 
1443 Henry Marschall
1445 Richard Mydelom
1447 Thomas Mirfelde
1449 William Harrison
1451 Thomas Pesse
 ? ?      William Worsley
1453 Robert Walker  
1468 Robert Hogley
1474 Richard Nicholl
1483 Stephen Hobson
1485 Thomas Watson
1499 Thomas Randesby
1501 Simon Spynk
1503 John Clewgh
1522 Leonard Bower
1551 John Hudson
1558 Edmund Wingreve
1576 Robert Rogers
1598 John Noble
1599 Richard Molton
1619 Roland Campion
1624 Edward Barnes
1629 William Lacye
1632 Richard Baylye
1639 Nicholas Browne
1669 Stephen Maisters
1687 Robert Ward
1691 John Battersby
1711 William Ellay (Ella)
1714 Thomas Smith, BA (Cantab.); buried 17 May 1731 at North Leverton 
1731 Charles Henchman BA, MA, instituted 15 December 1731/16 December 1731; died 23 November 1780; monumental inscription in Chester Cathedral)
1780 William Davis
1811 William Singleton
1836 James Henry Willan, MA, (non-resident; lived at Gainsborough where he also served as master of the Grammar School. Monumental inscription, 1858, in Bole churchyard)
1858 Henry Stockdale (formerly Perpetual Curate of Misterton; established Bole School and built The Vicarage)
1873 Thomas Henry Craster
1886 Frederick Harcourt Hillersden
1891 Thomas Holland Chadwick
1913 George Bird
1926 Donald Thomas Glasford
1941 John Thomas Gordon
1947 William Henry Marshall
1954 Arthur Llewelyn Thomas (he and his successors were also vicars of Sturton-le-Steeple with Littleborough) 
1959 Charles John Llewelyn Jones
1965 John Norman Darrall
1966 Lawrence Rex Rowland Harris (later Rector of Clowne, Derbyshire)
1972 John Ford (he and his successors were additionally in charge of North Wheatley and South Wheatley)
1979 Adrian Butt
1986 Anthony Reader-Moore
1994 Michael Weston Briggs (also in charge of Clarborough from 2003; the various parishes eventually became known as the Clays Group). Retired 2005.

Latterly Bole has become part of the Retford Team Ministry.

Assistant Curates have included:

1823 John Mickle Lit 14 February 1823 Curate (Subscription on Appointment, ordained Deacon 1815 and Priest 1817).  Later Vicar of South Leverton.
1829 James Stovin BA Licensed 26 July 1829 Curate
1831 Thomas Curston BA Licensed 6 June 1831 Curate

The Vicarage 
Bole has a former Vicarage dating to 1864, but not used as such since 1965. It is now known as "Bole House" and was sold once again in 2009.

See also
Listed buildings in Bole, Nottinghamshire

References

13th-century church buildings in England
Church of England church buildings in Nottinghamshire
Grade II listed churches in Nottinghamshire
Bassetlaw District